Engineer's Day is observed in several countries on various dates of the year. 
On 25 November 2019, based on a proposal by the World Federation of Engineering Organizations (WFEO), UNESCO has proclaimed March 4 as 'UNESCO World Engineering Day for Sustainable Development'.

Country-wise list

References

External links

Engineering awards
Types of secular holidays
January observances
February observances
March observances
April observances
May observances
June observances
July observances
August observances
September observances
October observances
December observances
Holidays and observances by scheduling (nth weekday of the month)
Observances set by the Vikram Samvat calendar
Holidays and observances by scheduling (varies)